Keep It Simple is the seventh studio album by blues artist Keb' Mo'. The album won the Grammy Award for Best Contemporary Blues Album in 2005.

Track listing

Keb' Mo' - Vocal, guitar ( tr. 1-7, 9 -12 ), Bass (tr. 2, 5, 6 ), Mandolin [Steel] (tr. 2, 4 ), Mandolin ( tr. 6 ), Banjo [Bazuki] - ( tr. 6 ), Banjo ( tr. 9 ), Bouzouki [Bazuki] ( tr.12 ), synth ( tr. 12 ), percussion (tr. 9 )
Reggie McBride- Bass ( tr.1,7, 8, 9, 11 ) / Nathan East - (tr.3, 4, 10 ) /  Willie Weeks - bass ( tr. 12 ) 
Ricky Lawson| – Drums (tr. 1-3, 5,6, 10 ) / Steve Ferrone ( tr.7, 8, 9, 11 ) Chad Cromwell  - ( tr. 12 )
Jeff Paris – Harmonica ( tr. 1, 7 ), keyboards ( tr.8 ), organ ( tr.2, 10 ) piano ( tr. 11 ), Mandolin ( tr 2 )
Greg Phillinganes– Piano ( tr.1, 2,4, 5 ), el. piano ( tr. 6, 10 )| Written-By, Guitar, Vocals – Keb' Mo' (tr.1)
John Hobbs - electricl piano ( tr. 11 )
Robert Cray - Rhythm Guitar, Backing Vocals, 1-st solo , Robben Ford - Rhythm Guitar, Backing Vocals, 2-nd solo ( tr.8 )
Paul Franklin – Dobro (tr. 9, 12 ),  Sam Bush - Mandolin, Andrea Zonn – Backing Vocals, Violin ( tr.9 )

References

2004 albums
Keb' Mo' albums